Anavatos (Greek: Ανάβατος) is a medieval, now abandoned, village on the Greek island of Chios, 16 km from Chios (town).

Created in the Byzantine era, probably by workers of the Nea Moni of Chios, the village was abandoned after the Massacre of Chios in 1822 and the earthquake of 1881.

Above the village stands the medieval fortress.

Sources
Ανάβατος

Populated places in Chios
Former populated places in Greece
Medieval sites in Greece